Football in China includes the practice of American football, arena football, association football, paper football, and other "football"-termed sports in the territory of the People's Republic of China that does not include Hong Kong and Macau.

American football

History

Ancient 
A version of soccer called “cuju” was already practiced more than 2300 years ago in the city of Lin Zi as a military sport that served to train the troops and check the physical condition of the soldiers. What does cuju mean? CU means “to kick” and JU “a type of leather ball”. Cuju is regarded as an ancient Chinese ball game. It is a competitive game involving kicking the ball through a large opening and into a net, and just like modern-day American football, hands can be used when playing Cuju.This sport was quite popular in medieval China, and it was also more pervasive among the higher ranks and classes in ancient China. It was also played and enjoyed by the intellectuals, royalty, soldiers, and even the peasants. There were two forms of cuju. One served as a competition, in which teams played each other trying to score as many goals as possible with goals and keepers. The other type of exhibition was more for entertainment, which even had live music in the background and female players were allowed, with its main purpose was to demonstrate technique and dexterity.

The first recorded references to cuju in Chinese literature dates back to the Warring States Period (475-221 BC). Following this period came the rule of the Han dynasty from 202 BC to 220 AD. The Han dynasty brought wealth and cultural sophistication to China and allowed for cuju to flourish. However, after the falling out of the Han dynasty in 220 AD, cuju began to slowly decline in popularity. Despite its brief disappearance, the sport was revived during the Tang dynasty (618-907) where it was no longer restricted to nobility, but instead became a part of folk tradition and played at Chinese festivals. Cuju continued to cement itself in Chinese culture during the Song dynasty (960-1279) when China had reached new heights in economic, cultural and social development. There were many written records of Cuju and its influence in ancient China. A book called the Splendours of the Eastern Capital recorded the history of Cuju. Players of Cuju were usually men that came from wealthy families, some of whom played professionally. However, Cuju was not only limited to men, and other writers in the Tang Dynasty (618 to 907 AD) recorded stories of women playing alongside men. The sport was often played as entertainment for banquets and ceremonies, and even the Emperor Taizu of the Song Dynasty was seen in a painting playing Cuju. 
However, cuju again lost its importance during the Ming dynasty (1368-1644). The first Ming ruler even banned cuju altogether because it was believed to be a distraction from work and military training. After this disappearance, there never was another revival of cuju because western influences, like association football, officially got rid of cuju altogether.

Modern 

The Chinese Football Association Super League (referred to as "Chinese Super League" or "Chinese Super League") is the highest-level professional football league in mainland China (Hong Kong, Macao, and Taiwan have football associations and leagues directly under FIFA and AFC). Its lower leagues are the Chinese Football Association League A, the Chinese Football Association League B, and the Chinese Football Association Member Association Champions League.

The Chinese Super League started in 2004 and was formerly known as the Chinese Football League A, established in 1989. It is organized by the Chinese Football Association and operated by the Chinese Super League Co., Ltd. It is one of the most competitive football leagues in Asia with the highest average attendance rate. The champion will receive the Vulcan Cup. According to the latest ranking of the International Federation of Football History and Statistics in 2017, the Chinese Super League ranks 36th in the world and 3rd in the Asian League.

Since 2006, the number of participating clubs in the Chinese Super League has been stable at 16; on December 29, 2020, the Chinese Football Association confirmed that the Chinese Super League will expand to 18 teams in the 2022 season. The policy of “up 3 down 3” will be implemented in the 2022 season.

On July 6, 2022, the Chinese Football Association held a meeting to confirm that the Chinese Super League will resume home and away games from the 11th round (second stage) on August 5, 2022. On October 14, the "restart" time of the Chinese Super League was finally confirmed. The Chinese Super League officially announced the 19th round, the 20th round of supplementary matches and the 23rd-25th rounds.

Association football

The Chinese Super League (CSL) is the highest tier of professional association football in Mainland China, operating under the auspices of the Chinese Football Association (CFA). The Super League was created by the re-branding of the former top division, Chinese Football Association Jia-A League, in 2004. While the league originally consisted of 12 teams, 16 teams now compete in it. The league has witnessed match-fixing, illegal betting, and violence on and off the pitch which the government of the People's Republic of China has promised to fix. Two former top executives of the Football Association of China were arrested and prosecuted for taking bribes. The Super League is criticized for overusing of foreign players in clubs, including some record-breaking transfers of foreign players. The racist sentiment against foreign players, including African ones, has been seen.

The sport is covered by the media. National competitions are generally televised on CCTV-5 and CCTV-5+. Guangdong Television reserves rights, however, for the Premier League and the UEFA Champions League. Since 1996, CCTV-5 has had weekly programmes televising live games in the Italian Serie A and German Bundesliga to Football Night (足球之夜). Serie A, Bundesliga and La Liga are broadcast on CCTV-5. Shanghai's Dongfang Sports channel also has coverage.

Initiatives have been developed, including Vision China, a part FIFA Vision Asia. The program covers marketing, development, training, sports medicine, competitions, media, and fans. It also includes assessments on association football in China, planning matches, and monitoring them. Goal Project for China, a part of FIFA Goal Project, invested in China to help build the new headquarters of CFA. The government has created at least 70,000 fields and 24,000 schools.

Competition system 

The Chinese Super League is carried out in a double-round way of home and away games. There are 34 rounds in the whole season. The Chinese Super League implements the "up 3 down 3" policy, that is, the 16th, 17th and 18th places in the Chinese Super League are directly relegated to the A League. The 1st, 2nd, and 3rd places in the A League are directly promoted to the Chinese Super League.

Points rule 
Each team has 3 points for a win, 1 point for a draw, and 0 points for a loss.

After all the competitions of the Chinese Super League in the current year are completed, the player with the most points will rank first. If two or more teams have an equal number of points, they will be ranked in the following order:

1. Teams with equal points and more points in each other's competitions will be ranked first;

2. Teams with equal points and more goal difference in each other's games will be ranked first;

3. The team with the same score and the highest number of goals in each other's games will be ranked first;

4. The reserve team of the club to which it belongs is ranked first in the reserve team league this season, and it ranks first;

5. Teams with equal points that have the most goal difference in all competitions of the Chinese Super League in that year will rank first;

6. The team with equal points that scored the most goals in all the competitions of the Chinese Super League in that year will be ranked first;

7. The player with the highest fair play points is in the front (red and yellow cards will be deducted, 1 point will be deducted for each yellow card, and 3 points will be deducted for each red card);

8. Ranking will be determined by drawing lots.

Youth football 

There are three main pathways for Chinese youth to play football:

 The school-based system, which is itself divided by age into primary school, middle school, and high school
 The "National Youth Football Training Centre" (led by the CFA), which supports 12 men's and 14 women's youth training centers as of 2020
 The professional football club system

Chinese football stadiums with a +60,000 capacity

Notes

References

External links
Chinese Football Association official website 
Team China Official Website 
Profile on FIFA official website 
Profile on AFC official website  
Corruption in Chinese football about whole events 
Wildeastfootball.net